The Ostrogozhsk–Rossosh offensive was an offensive of the Voronezh Front on the Eastern Front of World War II against the Hungarian 2nd Army and parts of the Italian 8th Army as part of the Voronezh–Kharkov offensive. 

The offensive came after Operation Little Saturn, made in support of the Stalingrad encirclement. The offensive was supported from the south by the right flank of the Soviet 6th Army and the 3rd Tank Army of Pavel Rybalko.

References

Bibliography
 Голиков Ф. И. Острогожско-Россошанская операция, Военно-исторический журнал, 1973, № 1. 
 Thomas Schlemmer (Hrsg.) : Die Italiener an der Ostfront 1942/43: Dokumente zu Mussolinis Krieg gegen die Sowjetunion (übersetzt von Georg Kuck). München, Oldenbourg, 2005, 291 pages, Literaturverz. S. [275] – 283. Schriftenreihe der Vierteljahrshefte für Zeitgeschichte 91, .
 V. P. Morozov: Westlich von Woronesh: Kurzer militärhistorischer Abriss der ..., veröffentlicht 1959, Verlag des Ministeriums für Nationale Verteidigung, 202 pages.
 Alessandro Massignani: Alpini e Tedeschi sul Don. Edizioni Gino Rossato, Novale-Valdagno (Vicenza) 1991.
 Mario Rigoni Stern: Ritorno sul Don. Einaudi 1973, Edizione collana Nuovi Coralli, .

Conflicts in 1943
1943 in the Soviet Union
Strategic operations of the Red Army in World War II
Military operations of World War II involving Germany